The retropharyngeal lymph nodes, from one to three in number, lie in the buccopharyngeal fascia, behind the upper part of the pharynx and in front of the arch of the atlas, being separated, however, from the latter by the Longus capitis.

Their afferents drain the nasal cavities, the nasal part of the pharynx, and the auditory tubes.

Their efferents pass to the superior deep cervical lymph nodes.

They are in the retropharyngeal space.

They frequently disappear by age 4-5. (This is why retropharyngeal abscess is rare in older children.)

See also
 Rouvière node

References

External links
 https://web.archive.org/web/20080216031919/http://www.med.mun.ca/anatomyts/head/hnl3a.htm
 http://www.emedicine.com/ent/topic306.htm#section~anatomy_of_the_cervical_lymphatics

Lymphatics of the head and neck